This is a list of artworks by Louise Nevelson that are available to the public.

United States

Arizona

Windows to the West, 1972, Scottsdale Civic Center Mall, Scottsdale

California

Night Presence II, 1976, San Diego Museum of Art, San Diego
Night Sail, 1983, Wells Fargo Center, Los Angeles
Sky Tree, 1976–1977, Embarcadero Center, San Francisco

Connecticut

Untitled, 1977, Lippincott Inc., New Haven

District of Columbia

Sky Landscape, 1983, American Medical Association

Florida

Night Wall II, 1976, Florida International University, Miami
Dawn's Forest, 1985, Naples Philharmonic Centre, Naples

Hawaii

Black Zag X, 1969, Honolulu Museum of Art

Illinois

Dawn Shadows, 1982, Madison Plaza, Chicago

Kansas

Night Tree, 1971, Ulrich Museum of Art, Wichita
Seventh Decade Garden IX-X, 1970, Spencer Museum of Art, Lawrence

Maryland
Seventh Decade Forest, 1971, Baltimore Museum of Art, Baltimore
Sky Horizon, 1986, National Institutes of Health, Bethesda

Massachusetts

Night Wall I, 1972, Harvard University, Cambridge
Sky Covenant, 1973, Temple Israel, Boston
Transparent Horizon, 1975, Massachusetts Institute of Technology, Cambridge

Michigan

Atmosphere and Environment XI, Frederik Meijer Gardens and Sculpture Park, Grand Rapids
The Bendix Trilogy, 1978, 20650 Civic Center Dr., Southfield
Summer Night Tree, 1978, Jackson Square, Jackson
Dark Presence III, 1971, University of Michigan Museum of Art, Ann Arbor

Missouri

Voyage, ca. 1980, Hallmark Cards, Kansas City

New Jersey

Atmosphere and Environment X, 1969-1970, Princeton University, Princeton

New York
Atmosphere and Environment V, 1966, The Governor Nelson A. Rockefeller Empire State Plaza Art Collection, Albany
Celebration II, 1976, Donald M. Kendall Sculpture Gardens, Purchase
City on the High Mountain, 1983, Storm King Art Center, Mountainville
Dawn's Column, ca. 1970, Government Plaza, Binghamton
Mrs. N's Palace, 1964-1977, Metropolitan Museum of Art, New York
Night Presence, 1972, Park Ave at 92nd St., New York
Night Tree, 1971, Pace Gallery, New York
Shadows and Flags, 1977, Louise Nevelson Plaza, New York
Sky Gate, New York, 1977-1978, Port Authority of New York and New Jersey, New York
Untitled, Riverfront Apartments, 420 E. 54th St, New York

Ohio

Sky Landscape II, 1979, Public Library of Cincinnati and Hamilton County, Cincinnati
Sky Presence I, 1967, Toledo Museum of Art, Toledo

Pennsylvania
Atmosphere and Environment XII, 1970, Philadelphia Museum of Art, Philadelphia
Bicentennial Dawn, 1976, James A. Byrne Federal Courthouse (interior), 601 Market Street, Philadelphia
Tropical Garden's Presence, 1974, Carnegie Institute, Pittsburgh

Texas

Frozen Laces - One, 1979-1980, 1400 Smith Street, Houston

Virginia
Untitled, 1973, Muscarelle Museum of Art, Williamsburg, Virginia

References

Sculptures by American artists
Nevelson